The Watanabe E9W was a Japanese submarine-borne reconnaissance seaplane, the first aircraft designed by Watanabe Ironworks.

Development and design
In January 1934, the Imperial Japanese Navy had a requirement for a two-seat reconnaissance seaplane to be operated from its J-3 type submarines, and placed an order with Watanabe for design and development of an aircraft to meet this requirement, the first of three prototypes flying in February 1935.

The E9W was a two-seat single-engine twin-float unequal-span seaplane designed to be easily dismantled for hangar stowage on a submarine, capable of being reassembled in two minutes 30 seconds and disassembled in one minute 30 seconds. It was armed with a 7.7 mm (0.303 in) machine gun operated by the observer. Following successful testing of one of the prototypes on the submarine I-5, an order for a production batch of 32 aircraft, designated E9W1, was placed.

Operational history
The aircraft entered service in 1938 with the Imperial Japanese Navy Air Service as the Navy Type 96 Small Reconnaissance Seaplane with the last being delivered in 1940. Although it was in the process of being replaced by the Yokosuka E14Y monoplane, it was still in front line service at the time of the Japanese attack on Pearl Harbor, remaining in service until July 1942, being used to direct their parent submarines onto Chinese ships attempting to pass the Japanese blockade of the South China Sea. The E9W1 was given the reporting name Slim in 1942 by the Allies of World War II.

Operators

 Imperial Japanese Navy: IJN Air Service

Specifications (E9W1)

See also

References

Notes

Bibliography
  
  

 
 

Floatplanes
Biplanes
E09W, Watanabe
Submarine-borne aircraft
E9W
Single-engined tractor aircraft
Aircraft first flown in 1935